La Alteración is the sixteenth studio album by Japanese singer Akina Nakamori and second studio album to be released during 1990's. It was released on 21 July 1995 under the MCA Records label. The album includes lead singles Genshi, Onna wa Taiyō Datta.

In 2002 was released re-printed version of the album La Alteración+4 which includes original version of Genshi, Onna wa Taiyou Datta, single Tokyo Rose and B-sides Kirei and Yasashii Kankei, which was previously unreleased in the album recordings.

Promotion

Single
It consists of one previously released single.

Genshi, Onna wa Taiyou Datta is the thirty-third single written by Masaki and Neko Oikawa. It was released on 21 June 1995, it was the first single to be released in that year. It includes renewed arrangement with the double echoes, compared to the original. The original version was included re-printed version of album, La Alteración+4 and compilation albums True Akina 96 Best Album, Utahime Densetsu: 90's Best and All Time Best: Originals under the Universal Music label.

The single debuted at number 15 on the Oricon Single Weekly Charts.

Stage performances
The album tracks Tokyo Rose, Gaia: Chikyuu no Sasayaki, Tsurai Tsurai, Shitataru Jounestsu, Itai Koi wo Shita and Necessary has been performed in the special live Nakamori Akina True Live in 1995.

Genshi, Onna wa Taiyou Datta special live Nakamori Akina True Live, in live tour Music Fiesta in 2002 and Last Destination in 2006.

Chart performance
The album reached at number 7 on the Oricon Album Weekly Chart charted for the 8 consecutive weeks with the sales of 149,100 copies. It's Akina's last studio album which sold over 100,000 copies.

Until 2002 cover album Zero Album Utahime 2, none of Nakamori albums didn't debut at Top 10 in the Oricon Album Weekly Charts.

Track listing

La Alteración

La Alteración+4

References

1995 albums
Japanese-language albums
Akina Nakamori albums
Albums produced by Akina Nakamori